Aasa Buttar is a small village located in the Giddarbaha Tehsil of Sri Muktsar Sahib district of Eastern Punjab. The village is dominated by the Jatt people of Buttar clan.

Demographics

According to the 2001 census, the village had the total population of 2,692 with 464 households, 1,393 males and 1,299 females. Thus males constitutes 52% and females 48% of total population with the sex ratio of 933 females per thousand males.

Geography

Bhuttiwala (3.5 km), Surewala (4 km) and Doda (12.5 km) are the surrounding villages.

Religion

Sikhism is the main faith of the village. All Jatts of the village are Sikhs.

Economy

Being a rural area of Punjab, agriculture is the main source of income for all Jatt people of the village.

References

Villages in Sri Muktsar Sahib district